was the pen-name of a noted translator, author and literary critic in Taishō and Shōwa period Japan.

Biography
Ikuta was born in what is now part of the town of  Hino, Tottori, and was educated at St Andrew’s School in Osaka, a school run by the Anglican Church in Japan. In 1898 he converted to Unitarianism. He moved to Tokyo the following year and was accepted into the First Higher School in 1900. He was accepted into the Department of Literature of Tokyo Imperial University in 1903. While in Tokyo, he became friends with Ueda Bin, who suggested his nickname. He graduated in 1906, and after returning briefly to Tottori to get married, moved into rooms provided by Yosano Tekkan and Yosano Akiko in Kojimachi, Tokyo where he taught as an English language instructor at a women’s college until 1909. This was also the start of his association with women’s literature, and his literary circle included Okamoto Kanoko, Yamakawa Kikue and Hiratsuka Raicho.

In 1909, Ikuta began his translation of Friedrich Nietzsche’s Thus Spoke Zarathustra into Japanese, which was completed in 1911. The same year, he also assisted Hiratsuka in the publication of her literary magazine Bluestocking. He continued to work on translation of Nietzsche from 1916 through 1929, eventually translating all of Nietzsche’s works into Japanese. he also translated Homer’s Odyssey in 1922.

Also around this time, he began a correspondence with the socialist Toshihiko Sakai and the anarchist Sakae Ōsugi. This led to an interest in the works of Karl Marx, and he translated Das Kapital into Japanese in 1919. However, his flirtation with Marxism was short-lived, and he had distanced himself from Marxist ideals by 1923. His interest in anarchism lasted longer, and maintained a correspondence with Takamure Itsue for many years. He translated Dante’s Divine comedy in 1924.

From 1925 to 1930 Ikuta moved to Yuigahama in Kamakura. At some point before this time, he contracted Hansen’s Disease. he left Kamakura before the physical effects of the disease became apparent, and lived in Shibuya, Tokyo until his death in 1936. His final work was a translation of Dumas’s Camellia.

His grave is at Hase-dera in Kamakura.

See also
 Japanese literature
 List of Japanese authors

References
 Chieko Irie Mulhern: "Japanese Women Writers: A Bio-Critical Sourcebook", Greenwood Publishing Group, 1994, pg. 133
 Yoshimi Takeuchi, Richard Calichman (Eds.): " What Is Modernity?: Writings Of Takeuchi Yoshimi", Columbia University Press, 2005, pg. 169

Notes

1881 births
1936 deaths
Japanese Protestants
University of Tokyo alumni
Japanese literary critics
Writers from Tottori Prefecture
Deaths from leprosy
20th-century Japanese translators